Emad Mirjavan (Mirhadi Mirjavan) (born 6 July 1988) is an Iranian footballer who plays as a forward for Naft Masjed Soleyman.

References

Sepahan S.C. footballers
1988 births
Living people
People from Rasht
Iranian footballers
Association football forwards
Naft Masjed Soleyman F.C. players
Sportspeople from Gilan province